The Boeing X-51 Waverider is an unmanned research scramjet experimental aircraft for hypersonic flight at  and an altitude of . The aircraft was designated X-51 in 2005. It completed its first powered hypersonic flight on 26 May 2010.  After two unsuccessful test flights, the X-51 completed a flight of over six minutes and reached speeds of over Mach 5 for 210 seconds on 1 May 2013 for the longest duration powered hypersonic flight.

Waverider refers in general to aircraft that take advantage of compression lift produced by their own shock waves. The X-51 program was a cooperative effort by the United States Air Force, DARPA, NASA, Boeing, and Pratt & Whitney Rocketdyne. The program was managed by the Aerospace Systems Directorate within the U.S. Air Force Research Laboratory (AFRL).

Design and development
In the 1990s, the Air Force Research Laboratory (AFRL) began the HyTECH program for hypersonic propulsion.  Pratt & Whitney received a contract from the AFRL to develop a hydrocarbon-fueled scramjet engine which led to the development of the SJX61 engine. The SJX61 engine was originally meant for the NASA X-43C, which was eventually canceled.  The engine was applied to the AFRL's Scramjet Engine Demonstrator program in late 2003.  The scramjet flight test vehicle was designated X-51 on 27 September 2005.

The booster is then jettisoned and the vehicle's Pratt & Whitney Rocketdyne SJY61 scramjet accelerates it to a top flight speed near . The X-51 uses JP-7 fuel for the SJY61 scramjet, carrying  on board.

Applications for hypersonic technology
DARPA once viewed X-51 as a stepping stone to Blackswift, a planned hypersonic demonstrator which was canceled in October 2008.

In May 2013, the U.S. Air Force planned to apply X-51 technology to the High Speed Strike Weapon (HSSW), a missile similar in size to the X-51. The HSSW was expected to fly in 2020 and enter service in the mid-2020s.

Testing

Ground and unpowered testing
Ground tests of the X-51A began in late 2005.  A preliminary version of the X-51, the "Ground Demonstrator Engine No. 2", completed wind tunnel tests at the NASA Langley Research Center on 27 July 2006.  Testing continued there until a simulated X-51 flight at Mach 5 was successfully completed on 30 April 2007. The testing is intended to observe acceleration between Mach 4 and Mach 6 and to demonstrate that hypersonic thrust "isn't just luck".  Four captive test flights were initially planned for 2009. However, the first captive flight of the X-51A on a B-52 was conducted on 9 December 2009, with further flights in early 2010.

Powered flight testing
The first powered flight of the X-51 was planned for 25 May 2010, but the presence of a cargo ship traveling through a portion of the Naval Air Station Point Mugu Sea Range caused a 24-hour delay. The X-51 completed its first powered flight successfully on 26 May 2010. The test had the longest hypersonic flight time of 140 seconds while under its scramjet power. The X-43 had the previous longest flight burn time of 12 seconds, while setting a new speed record of Mach 9.68.

Three more test flights were planned and used the same flight trajectory.  Boeing proposed to the Air Force Research Laboratory (AFRL) that two test flights be added to increase the total to six, with flights taking place at four to six week intervals, provided there are no failures.

The second test flight was initially scheduled for 24 March 2011, but was not conducted due to unfavorable test conditions. The flight took place on 13 June 2011. However, the flight over the Pacific Ocean ended early due to an inlet unstart event after being boosted to Mach 5 speed. The flight data from the test was being investigated. The X-51's scramjet engine lit on ethylene, but did not properly transition to JP-7 fuel operation.

The third test flight took place on 14 August 2012. After separating from its rocket booster, the craft lost control and crashed into the Pacific. The Air Force Research Laboratory (AFRL) determined the problem was the X-51's upper right aerodynamic fin unlocked during flight and became uncontrollable; all four fins are needed for aerodynamic control. The aircraft lost control before the scramjet engine could ignite.

On 1 May 2013, the X-51 performed its first fully successful flight test on its fourth test flight. It then separated cleanly from the booster and ignited its own engine. Researchers collected telemetry data for 370 seconds of flight. The test signified the completion of the program. The Air Force Research Laboratory believes the successful flight will serve as research for practical applications of hypersonic flight, such as a missile, reconnaissance, transport, and air-breathing first stage for a space system.

Specifications

See also
 Boeing Small Launch Vehicle concept, includes a hypersonic waverider as the second stage
 Flight airspeed record
 Scramjet programs

References

External links

 X-51 fact sheet on USAF site
 
 "AFRL mulls adding scope to X-51A Waverider hypersonic tests". Flight International, March 2009.
 "Pratt & Whitney Rocketdyne Scramjet Excels in USAF Tests". Aviation Week - subscription
 YouTube video of FoxNews report, preceding test flight
 YouTube video of test flight, shot from NASA chase plane

X-51, Boeing
X-51, Boeing
X-51
X-51, Boeing
X-51, Boeing
Single-engined jet aircraft
Aircraft with auxiliary rocket engines
Air Force Research Laboratory projects
Aircraft first flown in 2010